Satpal Singh Satti (born 5 January 1964) is an Indian politician and member of the Bharatiya Janata Party. He won the Una constituency consecutively three times for BJP in 2003, 2007, 2012 and after that he lost the 2017 Assembly election to Satpal Raizada of Congress. And in 2022 he won again in Assembly elections from Satpal Raizada.

He had been the longest serving president of Himachal Pradesh state unit of Bharatiya Janta Party. Satpal Satti’s legislative constituency is a part of Anurag Thakur parliamentary  constituency.

References

People from Solan district
Bharatiya Janata Party politicians from Himachal Pradesh
Living people
21st-century Indian politicians
Himachal Pradesh MLAs 2003–2007
Himachal Pradesh MLAs 2007–2012
Himachal Pradesh MLAs 2012–2017
Himachal Pradesh MLAs 2022–2027
1964 births